Typhoon Man-yi was a very severe storm that brought very strong winds and flash floods to Japan during mid-September. The third typhoon of the 2013 Pacific typhoon season, Man-yi was identified on September 10. It became a storm on September 12 and reached peak intensity on September 15. Japan was then experiencing winds above 30 knots. Typhoon Man-yi became extratropical on September 16 and fully dissipated late on September 20 in the Kamchatka Peninsula region, bringing strong winds until September 25.

Meteorological history

A large disturbance formed near the Northern Mariana Islands late on September 9. It was designated as 16W by the JTWC and JMA upgraded to a tropical storm naming it Man-yi on September 13, moving north then west on September 13. Man-yi still started intensifying and grew larger more later that day as it dropped a pressure of 20 millibars.

Late on September 14, Man-yi became a severe tropical storm, absorbing few dry air and making a small unbalanced eye. Man-yi started moving towards Japan making more strong winds to Japan on September 15 and made landfall on September 16 near Toyohashi, Aichi Prefecture.

Preparations and impact
During September 14, as winds started to get stronger, evacuations were ordered to many places. In Kyoto, 268,000 residences were ordered to leave and about 81,000 in Fukuchiyama.

In Kyoto on September 16, 260,000 people in the city were ordered to evacuate to shelters. Hundreds of thousands of others were also ordered to evacuate across mainly the west side of Japan. The JMA issued a “special warning” for three western Japan prefectures of Fukui, Kyoto, and Shiga. Over 70 people were injured and at least one person was killed. The government of Japan set up emergency task forces and employed rescue teams. Many homes were flooded and about 80,000 were without electricity in western and central Japan. Trains in Tokyo and its vicinity were mostly suspended and hundreds of flights were grounded.

The storm made its first landfall in Toyohashi, Aichi Prefecture in 08:00am on September 15 as 2 people were reported dead and 6 missing. During the morning hours of September 16, another 4 people were dead by falling trees, landslides and flashfloods. According to the Japan Meteorological Agency, precipitation in the 48 hours through Monday morning reached about 300 mm in parts of the cities of Kyoto and Otsu — more than they usually get for the entire month. Precipitation topped 500 mm in parts of Mie and Nara, the agency said. In Osaka, about 290,000 residents in the city's harbor area were forced to flee early Monday. Although the evacuation order was lifted that afternoon, officials warned that the raging river currents were still dangerous.

Severe thunderstorms associated with the typhoon resulted in a localized tornado outbreak with nine tornadoes touching down; none of these exceeded F1 intensity.

As of 09:00 pm on September 17, Typhoon Man-yi had weakened to an extratropical cyclone off Hokkaido, where up to 150 mm of rain was projected to have fallen by late Tuesday afternoon, the agency said. Damage across Japan were huge, total loss reached ¥160 billion (US$1.62 billion).

See also

Typhoon Tokage (2004)
2013 Pacific typhoon season
Typhoon Wipha (2013)
Typhoon Mindulle (2016)

References

External links

JMA General Information of Typhoon Man-yi (1318) from Digital Typhoon
JMA Best Track Data of Typhoon Man-yi (1318) 
JTWC Best Track Data of Tropical Storm 16W (Man-yi)
16W.MAN-YI from the U.S. Naval Research Laboratory

2013 Pacific typhoon season
Typhoons in Japan
2013 in Japan
Typhoons
Man-yi